Jean-Baptiste Thorn (17 March 1783 – 23 March 1841) was a Luxembourg-born jurist and politician that held office in both Luxembourg and Belgium during and immediately after the Belgian Revolution.

He was a member of the National Congress of Belgium (1830–1831), the revolutionary body responsible for drafting the new Belgian constitution, and served as governor of the Belgian provinces of Luxembourg (1830–1836) and Hainaut (1836–1841).

After the Revolution, Thorn returned to the (partitioned) Grand Duchy of Luxembourg, where he became a councillor on the communal council of Luxembourg City.

References
 

|-

1783 births
1841 deaths
Governors of Luxembourg (Belgium)
Governors of Hainaut (province)
Members of the National Congress of Belgium
Councillors in Luxembourg City
Independent politicians in Luxembourg
Luxembourgian revolutionaries
Luxembourgian jurists
People from Remich